The Workers Party of Britain (WPB) is a minor political party in Britain, formed in December 2019 and led by George Galloway. It has never held elected representation at any level of government.

History 
The Workers Party of Britain was founded in response to the Labour Party's landslide defeat at the 2019 United Kingdom general election and the resignation of Jeremy Corbyn as Leader of the Labour Party. It was formed with a commitment to "defend the achievements of the USSR, China, Cuba etc." The WPB labels itself as an opposition to Labour, arguing that the latter no longer represents the British working class. The party has defended Chris Williamson, who was suspended from the Labour Party for his comments about antisemitism allegations in the Labour Party, and Ken Livingstone, who left the party following allegations of antisemitism. 

The party had strong links with the Communist Party of Great Britain (Marxist–Leninist) (CPGB-ML), which welcomed the foundation of the WPB. Joti Brar, vice-chair of the CPGB-ML, was elected as deputy leader of the WPB. According to The Nationals George Kerevan, Brar is a Maoist. The WPB recognises the support the CPGB-ML offered to Galloway concerning his support for Brexit. 

In March 2021, the party stood its first candidate for elected office, Paul Burrows, in the by-election for Helensburgh and Lomond South ward on Argyll and Bute Council. Burrows came last out of six, gaining 22 votes (0.9%).

In the 2021 United Kingdom local elections, the party stood more than 40 candidates for local elections in England, none of whom were elected. Its two candidates in Wakefield District Council received 80 and 43 votes. In the ward of Chopwell and Rowlands Gill, Andrew Metcalf gained 200 votes, coming in fourth.

The WPB contested its first parliamentary seat at the 2021 Batley and Spen by-election, with Galloway as its candidate. Galloway gained 8,264 votes (21.9%) and came in third, behind the winning Labour candidate Kim Leadbeater and second placed Conservative candidate Ryan Stephenson. The Lib Dems came in fourth place, as they did in the previous election. Galloway concentrated on the issues of the Palestinian territories, the Kashmir conflict, criticism of Labour leader Keir Starmer, the suspension of a teacher for showing a cartoon of Prophet Muhammad at Batley Grammar School, and the reopening of a police station in Batley. The campaign received considerable media attention due to incidents of harassment during its final days. The Jewish Labour Movement called the result a "triumph for hope and decency" over Galloway's "toxic politics". Galloway vowed to challenge the result on the basis of an alleged "false statement" made about him by Leadbeater and Starmer, which he said tipped the result of the by-election.

The party contested the Almond ward of Edinburgh council in the 2022 Scottish local elections, but came last with 61 first preference votes (0.4%).

The party did not stand in the 2022 Wakefield by-election or the 2022 Tiverton and Honiton by-election.

Platform
The party describes itself as "economically radical with an independent foreign policy" and "unequivocally committed to class politics".

In May 2021, Galloway described the party as "the working-class patriotic alternative to fake woke anti-British 'Labour.

Election results

Senedd elections

Scottish Parliament elections

UK Parliamentary by-elections

Notable members 

 George Galloway (founder and leader of the WPB, formerly an MP 1987–2005 (for Labour and as an independent), then 2005–2010 and 2012–2015 (both for the Respect Party)
 Brian Travers, founding member (former band member of UB40). Died 22 August 2021.

References

2019 establishments in the United Kingdom
Eurosceptic parties in the United Kingdom
Political parties established in 2019
Political parties in the United Kingdom
George Galloway
Left-wing parties in the United Kingdom